David DeJulius (born August 9, 1999) is an American college basketball player for Cincinnati, where he was a two-time Third-team All-AAC performer. He previously played for Michigan. He attended Edison Public School Academy for two years before transferring to East English Village Preparatory Academy, where he finished 3rd in the 2018 Mr. Basketball of Michigan.

Early life
DeJulius was born August 9, 1999, in Detroit, Michigan to Latrice Halthon and Ladell DeJulius. He has a brother, Terrell Thornton, and three sisters, Aaliyah DeJulius, Cerisse DeJulius and Latriece DeJulius.

High school
DeJulius attended Edison Public School Academy for his freshman and sophomore seasons. As a freshman, he was selected to the 2015 Class C All-State team (2nd-team, The Detroit News; 4th team Detroit Free Press). As a sophomore, he was again selected to the 2016 Class C All-State team (2nd-team, The Detroit News; 3rd team Detroit Free Press, honorable mention Associated Press).

He transferred to East English Village Preparatory Academy for his junior and senior seasons.
After visiting the University of Michigan a few times (including September 17, 2016 and October 25, 2016) and scoring 46 points with 7 rebounds and 5 assists against Dakota High School and Michigan State Spartans men's basketball signee Thomas Kithier in front of head coach John Beilein and the entire coaching staff on December 17, 2016, DeJulius got an offer and gave a verbal commitment on December 22. At the time, he was the 172nd ranked player in the national class of 2018 and the 32nd ranked point guard. DeJulius was a 2017 Class A All-state honoree (1st team Associated Press).

On November 10, 2017, DeJulius tendered his National Letter of Intent as part of a five-man recruiting class that included Ignas Brazdeikis, Colin Castleton, Brandon Johns, and Adrien Nunez. DeJulius also had offers from Michigan State and DePaul. DeJulius earned 2018 Mr. PSL for his play in the Detroit Public School League. In January 2018, DeJulius scored 49 points in a 92–82 victory against Chicago's Orr Academy High School with 13-of-19 shooting from the field, including 9-of-11 3-point shooting. Orr was the defending 2017 Illinois High School Association Class 2A state champion and would repeat in 2018.

With 2,542 points, DeJulius finished 3rd behind Michigan State signee Foster Loyer (3,691) and Michigan signee Brandon Johns (2,792) in the 2018 Mr. Basketball of Michigan voting. In his only head-to-head meeting with Loyer, DeJulius scored 42 points in an 80–71 comeback to give Clarkston High School its only regular season loss against 21 points, 12 assists, and eight rebounds from Loyer. East English had trailed in the heralded battle of the state's two best point guards 49–31 at the half and 63–53 after three quarters until DeJulius had 25 points in the second half, including erupting for 17 in the fourth quarter, against the defending 2017 Michigan High School Athletic Association Class A state champions, who would repeat in 2018. DeJulius was an 2018 All-class first team All-state selection by The Detroit News.

College

Michigan

Freshman season
The 2017–18 Michigan team was the national runner-up in the 2018 NCAA Division I men's basketball tournament. The 2018–19 team was expected to be ranked by ESPN (17) and CBS Sports (21). Of the incoming class, Brazdeikis had the highest expectations from Yahoo! Sports and ESPN. USA Today expected Johns to be the brightest newcomer. DeJulius played 25 games as a freshman for the 2018–19 Wolverines. The head coach of the team was John Beilein and by the end of the season DeJulius was behind Zavier Simpson and his backup Eli Brooks on the depth chart. The team lost the last game of the regular season to Loyer's Michigan State Spartans finishing one game behind the Spartans and Purdue for the Big Ten regular season championship. The team was unable to defend its Big Ten Tournament championship in the championship game of the 2019 Big Ten men's basketball tournament against Michigan State, who swept three rivalry games from Michigan that season. The Wolverines finished the season with a 30–7 record, for its second consecutive 30-win season, losing in the Sweet Sixteen round of the 2019 NCAA tournament to (#9/#10) Texas Tech.

Sophomore season

On May 22, 2019, Juwan Howard was named the head coach of the Michigan Wolverines men's basketball team, signing a five-year contract. Brazdeikis, Charles Matthews and Jordan Poole declared for the 2019 NBA draft. As a sophomore for the 2019–20 Michigan Wolverines with starting guards Simpson and Brooks as well as Franz Wagner, DeJulius came off the bench as the sixth man averaging 7.0 points, 2.4 rebounds and 1.5 assists in 20.9 minutes. 

On November 15, Michigan defeated Elon 70–50 DeJulius added 10 points and eight assists, both then career-highs. On November 27, Michigan defeated Iowa State 83–76 in the quarterfinals of the Battle 4 Atlantis tournament.DeJulius added a career-high 14 points. On January 28, with Simpson suspended and Isaiah Livers sidelined, DeJulius started against Nebraska and played 34 minutes. On March 8, Michigan lost to (#9/#9) Maryland 70–83 in their final game of the regular season. Michigan was led by DeJulius with a career-high 20 points. Michigan was scheduled to play Rutgers in the Big Ten tournament on March 12. However, the tournament and the remainder of the college basketball season was cancelled due to the coronavirus pandemic.

Although Simpson had completed his eligibility and Brooks would be a senior, DeJulius decided to enter the NCAA transfer portal in April 2020. In the portal, he received interest from Maryland, Missouri, Marquette, Cincinnati, Iowa State, DePaul, Rhode Island, Creighton and Arizona State. With over 20 schools expressing interest, DeJulius announced four finalists by April 10: Iowa State, Cincinnati, Marquette and Missouri. DeJulius had contributed 10+ points eleven times for the Wolverines as a  sophomore and some thought he was expected to earn the starting point guard role if he returned. However, Michigan had been pursuing point guards Bryce Aiken and Mike Smith in the transfer portal and recruiting Josh Christopher prior to DeJulius' announcement that he would transfer.

Cincinnati

Junior season
In August 2020, he was granted a waiver to play immediately as a transfer. On February 25, 2021, he became the fifth member of the 2020–21 Cincinnati Bearcats to opt out of the rest of the 2020–21 NCAA Division I men's basketball season due to the mental impact of COVID-19. Within two days after the March 14, 2021 American Athletic Conference men's basketball tournament championship game loss to Houston, the Bearcats saw six players enter the transfer portal. On March 26, the AD John Cunningham announced the university would begin investigating allegations against the program. On April 3, it was announced that Cincinnati head coach John Brannen was placed on indefinite leave. On April 9, Cincinnati announced Brannen had been relieved of his duties effective immediately. On April 14, 2021, Cincinnati hired Wes Miller to become their next head coach, replacing Brannen.

Senior season
On January 30, 2022, he scored the go-ahead basket with 3.7 seconds left against East Carolina. DeJulius posted 3 consecutive 20-point games on February 6 (25, #6 Houston), February 9 (24, South Florida), and February 12 (23, Tulsa), marking the first such streak by a Bearcat since Jarron Cumberland did so for the 2018–19 Bearcats over 3 years before. On February 24, 2022, he announced that he would not partake in Senior Night fanfare, in part because he was eligible to return with another year due to special COVID-19 waiver. DeJulius earned third-team All-American Athletic Conference as a true senior for the 2021–22 Cincinnati Bearcats men's basketball team. He averaged a team-leading 14.5 points per game, was the team's only All-AAC performer and decided to exercise his option to return.

COVID Redshirt 5th year season
DeJulius earned 2022-23 Preseason All-Conference Second Team recognition for his redshirt senior season. Before the season, he announced that he would donate his student athlete compensation proceeds from his team-licensed jersey sales to provide books to inner city youth in Detroit and Cincinnati. He began the season by leading the 2022–23 Cincinnati Bearcats to three victories, averaging 21.3 points and 3.7 assists while shooting 56.1% from the field, including 7-of-9 on three-point shots, and earning American Athletic Conference player of the week honors. When DeJulius was celebrated for Senior Night on March 5, 2023, along with Kalu Ezikpe and Rob Phinisee. That day against SMU, he posted a career-high 30 points with 6 assists. He repeated on the All-conference third-team. DeJulius entered the 2023 American Athletic Conference men's basketball tournament with a nation-leading 16-game streak of 5 or more assists. In the 2023 National Invitation Tournament first round victory over Virginia Tech, DeJulius had 21 points, 6 rebounds and 7 assists.

Career statistics

College

|-
| style="text-align:left;"| 2018–19
| style="text-align:left;"| Michigan
| 25 || 0 || 3.8|| .200 || .067 || .167 || 0.5 || 0.2 || 0.2 || 0.0 || 0.6
|-
| style="text-align:left;"| 2019–20
| style="text-align:left;"| Michigan
| 31 || 1 || 20.9 || .417 || .361 || .725 || 2.4 || 1.5 || 0.4 || 0.0 || 7.0
|-
| style="text-align:left;"| 2020–21
| style="text-align:left;"| Cincinnati
| 19 || 16 || 29.5 || .360 || .203 || .775 || 4.5 || 4.2 || 0.8 || 0.1 || 9.1
|-
| style="text-align:left;"| 2021–22
| style="text-align:left;"| Cincinnati
| 33 || 33 || 28.6 || .409 || .297 || .824 || 2.8 || 2.6 || 0.7 || 0.0 || 14.5
|-
| style="text-align:left;"| 2022–23
| style="text-align:left;"| Cincinnati
| 34 || 34 || 32.5 || .425 || .346 || .846 || 2.2 || 5.3 || 1.1 || 0.0 || 14.7
|- class="sortbottom"
| style="text-align:center;" colspan="2"| Career
| 142 || 84 || 23.6 || .403 || .302 || .796 || 2.4 || 2.8 || 0.7 || 0.0 || 9.7

See also
Cincinnati Bearcats men's basketball statistical leaders

Notes

External links
college stats at ESPN
college stats at Sports Reference
Michigan Wolverines bio
Cincinnati Bearcats bio

1999 births
Living people
American men's basketball players
Basketball players from Detroit
Cincinnati Bearcats men's basketball players
Michigan Wolverines men's basketball players
Point guards